Dorset was a merchant ship built by William Porter at Liverpool, England in 1835. She made a number of voyages around the south east coast of Australia with cargo and undertook one voyage transporting 9 male convicts to New South Wales.

Career
Under the command of John Mackie, she sailed from Port Adelaide on 20 November 1840 and arrived at Sydney on 1 December 1840. She carried passengers and embarked 9 male convicts under the command of three constables.

Dorset departed Port Jackson on 14 December 1840, bound for Port Phillip, with passengers.

Fate
While sailing under the command of Captain Birdwood from Hobart to Melbourne, she was wrecked upon the Kent Group in Bass Strait on 28 May 1852. There were no deaths.

Citations
Citations

1838 ships
Ships built on the River Mersey
Convict ships to New South Wales
Age of Sail merchant ships
Merchant ships of the United Kingdom
Merchant ships of Australia
Maritime incidents in May 1852